The 1990 San Francisco Giants season was the Giants' 108th season in Major League Baseball, their 33rd season in San Francisco since their move from New York following the 1957 season, and their 31st at Candlestick Park. The team finished in third place in the National League West with an 85–77 record, 6 games behind the Cincinnati Reds.

Offseason
 December 3, 1990: Willie McGee was signed as a free agent by the Giants.
 January 19, 1990: Gary Carter was signed as a free agent by the Giants.

Regular season
 In a game against the San Diego Padres, Gary Carter broke the National League record set by Al López for most games caught by a catcher. It was Carter's 1,862nd game as a catcher.

Opening Day starters
Kevin Bass
Brett Butler
Gary Carter
Will Clark
Kevin Mitchell
Rick Reuschel
Robby Thompson
José Uribe
Matt Williams

Season standings

Record vs. opponents

Notable transactions
 April 5, 1990: Greg Booker was signed as a free agent by the Giants.
April 8, 1990: Rick Leach was signed as a free agent with the San Francisco Giants.
 June 23, 1990: Ernie Camacho was released by the Giants.
 June 24, 1990: Rick Rodriguez was signed as a free agent by the Giants.
 August 12, 1990: Atlee Hammaker was released by the Giants.

Draft picks
June 4, 1990: Rikkert Faneyte was drafted by the San Francisco Giants in the 16th round of the 1990 amateur draft. Player signed March 19, 1991.

Major League debuts
Batters:
Steve Decker (Sep 18)
Mark Leonard (Jul 21)
Rick Parker (May 4)
Andres Santana (Sep 16)
Pitchers:
Mark Dewey (Aug 24)
Eric Gunderson (Apr 11)
Paul McClellan (Sep 2)
Rafael Novoa (Jul 31)

Roster

Player stats

Batting

Starters by position
Note: Pos = Position; G = Games played; AB = At bats; H = Hits; Avg. = Batting average; HR = Home runs; RBI = Runs batted in

Other batters
Note; G = Games played; AB = At bats; H = Hits; Avg.= Batting average; HR = Home runs; RBI = Runs batted in

Pitching

Starting pitchers
Note; G = Games pitched; IP = Innings pitched; W =Wins; L = Losses; ERA = Earned run average; SO = Strikeouts

Other pitchers
Note; G = Games pitched; IP = Innings pitched; W = Wins; L = Losses; ERA = Earned run average; SO = Strikeouts

Relief pitchers
Note; G = Games pitched; W = Wins; L = Losses; SV = Saves; ERA = Earned run average; SO = Strikeouts

Award winners
Steve Bedrosian P, Willie Mac Award
Will Clark, National League Leader, Sacrifice Flies (13)
All-Star Game
Kevin Mitchell, Matt Williams

Farm system

LEAGUE CHAMPIONS: Shreveport

References

External links
 1990 San Francisco Giants at Baseball Reference
 1990 San Francisco Giants at Baseball Almanac

San Francisco Giants seasons
San Francisco Giants
San Francisco Giants